Donald David Dixon Ronald O'Connor (August 28, 1925 – September 27, 2003) was an American dancer, singer and actor. He came to fame in a series of films in which he co-starred with Gloria Jean, Peggy Ryan, and Francis the Talking Mule.

O'Connor was born into a Vaudeville family, where he learned to dance, sing, play comedy, even slapstick.  The most distinctive characteristic of his dancing style was its athleticism, for which he had few rivals. Yet it was his boyish charm that audiences found most engaging, and which remained an appealing aspect of his personality throughout his career. In his early Universal films, O'Connor closely mimicked the smart alec, fast-talking personality of Mickey Rooney of rival MGM Studio. For Singin' in the Rain, however, MGM cultivated a much more sympathetic sidekick persona, and that remained O'Connor's signature image. 

His best-known work was his "Make 'Em Laugh" dance routine in Singin' in the Rain (1952), for which role O'Connor was awarded a Golden Globe. He also won a Primetime Emmy Award from four nominations and received two stars on the Hollywood Walk of Fame.

Early years
O'Connor was born in 1925 to Vaudevillians Edward "Chuck" O'Connor and Effie Irene (née Crane) in Chicago, the 200th child born at St. Elizabeth Hospital there. Both the O'Connors struggled to remember where and when exactly Donald was born, due to the family's extensive travel. Effie was a bareback rider and Chuck was a circus strongman and acrobat. His father's family was from Ireland.

O'Connor later said, "I was about 13 months old, they tell me, when I first started dancing, and they'd hold me up by the back of my neck and they'd start the music, and I'd dance. You could do that with any kid, only I got paid for it."

When O'Connor was only two years old, he and his seven-year-old sister, Arlene, were hit by a car while crossing the street outside a theater in Hartford, Connecticut; Donald survived, but his sister died. A few weeks later, his father died of a heart attack while dancing on stage in Brockton, Massachusetts. His brother Billy died a decade later from scarlet fever and his eldest sibling Jack died from alcoholism in 1959. Three other siblings died during childbirth. O'Connor said the tragedies "marred my childhood and it's still haunting."

O'Connor's mother was extremely possessive of her youngest son due to these traumas, not allowing him to cross the street on his own until he turned 13. Effie also stopped O'Connor from learning hazardous dance routines, and made sure she always knew where he was when he wasn't performing. She was a typical stage mother, often striking him.

O'Connor later said regarding Effie, "She wanted me to be as great as I possibly could be. She did her best."

Career

O'Connor Family
O'Connor joined a dance act with his mother and elder brother Jack. They were billed as the O'Connor Family, the Royal Family of Vaudeville. They toured the country doing singing, dancing, comedy, and acting. "Our entire family composed an act", he says. "We really didn't have a choice; if you were in the family you appeared in the act. I loved vaudeville. The live audiences created a certain spontaneity."

When they were not touring they stayed with O'Connor's Uncle Bill in Danville, Illinois. O'Connor never went to school.

He later said, "I learned two dance routines. I looked like the world's greatest dancer. I did triple wings and everything. But I had never had any formal training. So, when I went into movies and started working with all those great dancers, I had a terrible time. I couldn't pick up routines because I didn't have any formal training. At the age of 15 — from 15 on, I really had to learn to dance. And that's quite old for someone to start dancing real heavy, professionally."

Contrasting the Vaudevillian style of dance with that of ballet and musicals he observed, "All hoofers, they dance from the waist down. And I had to learn to dance from the waist up. And then, I became what's known as a total dancer."

O'Connor began performing in movies in 1937, making his debut aged 11 in Melody for Two appearing with his family act. He was also in Columbia's It Can't Last Forever (1937).

Paramount
O'Connor signed a contract at Paramount Studios. He appeared in Men with Wings (1938), directed by William Wellman, as Fred MacMurray's character as a boy. He was billed fifth in Sing You Sinners (1938) playing Bing Crosby's and MacMurray's younger brother.

He was in Sons of the Legion (1938), then had the second lead in a B-picture, Tom Sawyer, Detective (1938), playing Huckleberry Finn opposite Billy Cook's Tom Sawyer. O'Connor third billed in both Boy Trouble (1939) and Unmarried (1939), playing John Hartley as a young boy in the latter.

O'Connor was billed fourth in Million Dollar Legs (1939) with Betty Grable. He played Gary Cooper as a young boy in Beau Geste (1939), directed by Wellman.

Night Work (1939) was a sequel to Boy Trouble and O'Connor was in Death of a Champion (1939).

He went to Warner Bros to play Eddie Albert as a young boy in On Your Toes (1939). He then returned to his family act in vaudeville for two years.

Universal
In 1941, O'Connor signed with Universal Pictures for $200 a week, where he began with What's Cookin'? (1942), a low-budget musical with The Andrews Sisters, the studio's teenage singing star Gloria Jean, and Peggy Ryan. The film was popular and Universal began to develop O'Connor and Ryan as their version of Mickey Rooney and Judy Garland.

He, Ryan, and the Andrews Sisters were in Private Buckaroo (1942) and Give Out, Sisters (1942); then he was co-starred opposite Jean in four films: Get Hep to Love (1942), When Johnny Comes Marching Home (1943), It Comes Up Love (1943), and School for Jive, which showed O'Connor to such good advantage that he became the focal point of the film, retitled Mister Big (1943). Universal added $50,000 to the budget and elevated the "B" movie to "A" status.

O'Connor and Ryan were in Top Man (1943), with Susanna Foster, and Chip Off the Old Block (1944), with Ann Blyth. O'Connor and Ryan both had cameos in Universal's all-star Follow the Boys (1944).

During World War II, on his 18th birthday in August 1943, O'Connor was drafted into the United States Army. Before he reported for induction on February 6, 1944, Universal already had four O'Connor films completed. They rushed production to complete four more by that date, all with Ryan: This Is the Life (1944), with Foster; The Merry Monahans (1944), with Blyth and Jack Oakie; Bowery to Broadway (1945), another all-star effort where O'Connor had a cameo; and Patrick the Great (1945).

With a backlog of seven features, deferred openings kept O'Connor's screen presence uninterrupted during the two years he was overseas with Special Services in the U.S. Army Air Forces.

Return from war service
Upon O'Connor's return from military service Universal did not know what to do with their young star. O'Connor was almost broke. A merger in 1946 had reorganized the studio as Universal-International. Finally, the studio paired O'Connor opposite their biggest female star, Deanna Durbin, in Something in the Wind (1947).

He starred in Are You with It? (1948) with Olga San Juan, Feudin', Fussin' and A-Fightin' (1949) with Marjorie Main and Percy Kilbride, and Yes Sir, That's My Baby (1949) with Gloria DeHaven.

"I wasn't really a dancer, a good dancer, until I got older," he said later. "I could do those wings and stuff and I looked very good, but my heavens it was very, very hard for me to pick up on — pick up steps. It was just oh — so laborious for me. I didn't have a short cut like the other dancers do."

Francis
In 1949, O'Connor played the lead role in Francis, the story of a soldier befriended by a talking mule. Directed by Arthur Lubin, the film was a huge success. As a consequence, his musical career was constantly interrupted by production of one Francis film per year until 1955. O'Connor later said the films "were fun to make. Actually, they were quite challenging. I had to play straight in order to convince the audience that the mule could talk."

O'Connor followed the first Francis with comedies: Curtain Call at Cactus Creek (1950), The Milkman (1950), and Double Crossbones (1951).

He did Francis Goes to the Races (1951), another big hit. In February 1951 he signed a new contract with Universal for one film a year for four years, enabling him to work outside the studio.

Singin' in the Rain
In January of 1952 O'Connor signed a three-picture deal with Paramount. He also received an offer to play Cosmo the piano player in Singin' in the Rain (1952) at Metro-Goldwyn-Mayer

That film featured his widely known rendition of "Make 'Em Laugh", which he choreographed with help from the assistant dance directors and his brother.  O'Connor's unassuming yet extreme athleticism is on full display, with the number featuring dozens of jumps, pratfalls, and two backflips launched by running halfway up a wall.

"The scene was building to such a crescendo, I thought I'd actually have to kill myself," said O'Connor.  He maintained he was forced to go to the hospital during the film's production due to injuries and exhaustion.

His electric performance stood out, even alongside the matchless Gene Kelly, and earned him the 1953 Golden Globe Award for Best Performance by an Actor in a Comedy or Musical. 

O'Connor went back to Universal for Francis Goes to West Point (1952) then returned to MGM for I Love Melvin (1953) a musical with Debbie Reynolds.

He began appearing regularly on television. One review in 1952 called him "1952's new star. Movie bred, he has the versatility of a Jimmy Durante and the effervescence of youth. He can dance, he can sing, he can act, and he can spout humor, but not yet with the finesse of a veteran."

He supported Ethel Merman in Call Me Madam (1953) at 20th Century Fox, later saying the film contained his best dancing.

After Francis Covers the Big Town (1953), Universal put O'Connor in a musical in colour, Walking My Baby Back Home (1953) with Janet Leigh.

He did Francis Joins the WACS (1954) then played Tim Donahue in the 20th Century Fox all-star musical There's No Business Like Show Business (1954), which featured Irving Berlin's music and also starred with Ethel Merman, Marilyn Monroe (O'Connor's on screen love interest), Dan Dailey, Mitzi Gaynor and Johnnie Ray.

He was meant to play Bing Crosby's partner in White Christmas (1954). O'Connor was unavailable because he contracted an illness transmitted by the mule and was replaced in the film by Danny Kaye.

O'Connor's industry and public recognition reached a peak in 1954, when he was asked to emcee that year's Academy Awards ceremony.

The Donald O'Connor Show
He starred in The Donald O'Connor Show (1954–55) for one season. O'Connor was a regular host of NBC's Colgate Comedy Hour.

O'Connor was reluctant to keep making Francis films but agreed to Francis in the Navy (1955). Arthur Lubin, who directed the series, later recalled that O'Connor "got very difficult" to work with after a while. "He'd sit in his dressing room and stare into space, and I think he had problems at home."

Francis in the Navy was Donald O'Connor's last film for Universal after 13 years with the company. At a farewell luncheon, the studio executives presented him with a gift: a camera and 14 rolls of film. O'Connor was stunned at the insignificance of the gift after all the millions of dollars he had made for the studio, and in later life recalled, "What can I say about these people?"

O'Connor and Bing Crosby united on Anything Goes (1956) at Paramount. That studio also released The Buster Keaton Story (1957), in which O'Connor had the title role.

The Brussels Symphony Orchestra recorded some of his work, and in 1956 he conducted the Los Angeles Philharmonic in a performance of his first symphony, Reflections d'Un Comique.

He hosted a color television special on NBC in 1957, one of the earliest color programs to be preserved on a color kinescope; an excerpt of the telecast was included in NBC's 50th anniversary special in 1976.

In the late 1950s he began guest starring on shows like Playhouse 90, The DuPont Show of the Month, and The Red Skelton Hour. But his focus moved increasingly to touring live shows.

1960s
O'Connor teamed with Glenn Ford in Cry for Happy (1961) at Columbia and he played the title role in The Wonders of Aladdin (1961) for MGM.

He subsequently focused on theatre work and his nightclub act, performing in Las Vegas. He returned to Universal for the first time in ten years to make the Sandra Dee comedy That Funny Feeling (1965).

He did episodes of Bob Hope Presents the Chrysler Theatre, Vacation Playhouse, ABC Stage 67 and The Jackie Gleason Show. He also appeared in several productions of Little Me.

In 1968, O'Connor hosted a syndicated talk show also called The Donald O'Connor Show. The program was cancelled due to the dancer becoming "too political," and O'Connor was reprimanded by the studio.'1970s
He began to use nitroglycerin pills before performances so that he would have the stamina to complete them. He then suffered a heart attack in 1971, leading him to quit taking the medication.

He was in a TV production of Li'l Abner (1971) and continued to perform on stage, notably in Las Vegas.

He guest-starred on episodes of The Girl with Something Extra, Ellery Queen, The Bionic Woman, Police Story, and Hunter.

O'Connor claimed to have overcome his depression after being hospitalized for three months after collapsing in 1978. He wrote letters to his friends and family explaining that his life had "completely changed". The dancer was paralyzed from the waist down, but recovered by way of physical therapy. The letters detail the lives of other patients, particularly a 30-year-old man who was completely immobilized.

"I won't take anything I have for granted again," was written in each letter.

O'Connor credited the patients he met and thanked God for allowing him to recover.

1980s
He appeared as a gaslight-era entertainer in the 1981 film Ragtime, notable for similar encore performances by James Cagney and Pat O'Brien. It was his first feature film role in 16 years.

O'Connor appeared in the short-lived Bring Back Birdie on Broadway in 1981. The following year he was in I Ought to Be in Pictures in Los Angeles.

He was Cap'n Andy in a short-lived Broadway revival of Show Boat (1983) and continued to tour in various shows and acts.

"I've been on the road forever," he said in 1985, adding "I'd consider another movie or a TV series, but I won't play an old man. Art Carney is about my age and he's making a career out of being old. I'm still singing and dancing. I'm not ready to be old."

O'Connor guest starred on The Littlest Hobo, Fantasy Island, Simon & Simon, Hotel, Alice in Wonderland, The Love Boat, and Highway to Heaven, and was in the films Pandemonium (1982), A Mouse, a Mystery and Me (1988), and A Time to Remember (1988).

He bought a theatre, the Donald O'Connor Theatre, and would perform in it with his children. In a 1989 interview he said "There's an element out there that wants to be entertained-and they can't find this kind of thing I do. And yeah, I think I wear well. I sing, I dance, I do comedy. I'm not threatening. When you grow up in a circus family, the more things you learn, the more you get paid. So I can do straight comedy without the song and dance; I can do all kinds of combinations. Whatever's in at the time, I can fit into."

He developed heart trouble and underwent successful quadruple-bypass surgery in 1990.

1990s
O'Connor continued to make film and television appearances into the 1990s, including the Robin Williams film Toys (1992) as the president of a toy-making company. He continued to perform live.

He had guest roles in Murder, She Wrote, Tales from the Crypt, The Building, The Nanny and Frasier, and was in the films Bandit: Bandit's Silver Angel (1994), and Father Frost (1996).

In 1992 he said, "I never wanted to be a superstar. I'm working on being a quasar, because stars wear out. Quasars go on forever... I look for the parts where I die and they talk about me for the rest of the movie."

In 1998, he received a Golden Palm Star on the Palm Springs, California, Walk of Stars.

O'Connor's last feature film was the Jack Lemmon-Walter Matthau comedy Out to Sea, in which he played a dance host on a cruise ship. O'Connor was still making public appearances well into 2003. He said he went on the road "about 32 weeks a year. I do my concert work and I do night clubs and that kind of stuff. So I don't dance much any more, but I do enough to show people I can still move my legs."

Personal life
O'Connor was married twice and had four children. His first marriage was in 1944 to Gwendolyn Carter, when he was 18 and she was 20. They married in Tijuana. Together they had one child, a daughter Donna. The couple divorced in 1954.Donald O'Connor to Marry. The New York Times, 10 Oct 1956: 46. During the turbulent nine-year marriage, Carter physically abused O'Connor in frustration over her lack of an acting career. In the divorce Carter was given ownership of their home and custody of their daughter. According to reports at the time the couple split, O'Connor was left with only the dog and sought the help of multiple psychiatrists. Carter remarried in 1955 to actor Dan Dailey. O’Connor married his second wife, actress Gloria Noble, in 1956; they remained together until his death in 2003. They had three children, son Donald Frederick, daughter Alicia, and son Kevin. Noble died in 2013.

Donald was honored with a retrospective at New York's Lincoln Center and an honorary degree from Boston University. He chose to keep much of his philanthropy work private. Some of it includes work for the United States Army and Red Cross. He created the Donald O'Connor Alcoholism Counseling Scholarship.

O'Connor had undergone quadruple heart bypass surgery in 1990, and he nearly died from pleural pneumonia in January 1999. He died from complications of heart failure on September 27, 2003, at age 78 at the Motion Picture & Television Country House and Hospital, in Woodland Hills, California. His remains were cremated. His belongings were auctioned off and all proceeds were given to charity.

Legacy

 Won - June 1952 Photoplay Award for Singin' in the Rain Won - The 1953 Golden Globe for his role in Singin' in the Rain Nominated - 1953 Primetime Emmy Award for Most Outstanding Personality
 Won - 1954 Primetime Emmy Award for Best Male Star of Regular Series (for The Colgate Comedy Hour)
 Won - 1954 Golden Laurel Award for Top Male Musical Performance in Call Me Madam (1953)
 Earned - 1960, Star on the Hollywood Walk of Fame for his work in motion pictures
 Earned - 1960, Star on the Hollywood Walk of Fame for his work in television
 Nominated - 1960 Primetime Emmy award for Best Specialty Act - Single or Group
 Nominated - 1980 Primetime Emmy award for Outstanding Individual Achievement - Special Events (52nd Annual Academy Awards (1980))
 Earned - 1998, Golden Palm Star on the Palm Springs Walk of Stars

Filmography
Film

 Melody for Two (1937) as Specialty Act (uncredited)
 It Can't Last Forever (1937) as Kid Dancer (uncredited)
 Men with Wings (1938) as Pat Falconer at Age 13
 Sing You Sinners (1938) as Mike Beebe
 Sons of the Legion (1938) as Butch Baker
 Tom Sawyer, Detective (1938) as Huckleberry Finn
 Boy Trouble (1939) as Butch
 Unmarried (1939) as Ted Streaver (age 14)
 Million Dollar Legs (1939) as Sticky Boone
 Beau Geste (1939) as Beau Geste (as a child)
 Night Work (1939) as Butch Smiley
 Death of a Champion (1939) as Small Fry
 On Your Toes (1939) as Phil Jr. as a Boy
 What's Cookin'? (1942) as Tommy
 Private Buckaroo (1942) as Donny
 Give Out, Sisters (1942) as Don
 Get Hep to Love (1942) as Jimmy Arnold
 When Johnny Comes Marching Home (1942) as Frankie Flanagan
 It Comes Up Love (1943) as Ricky Ives
 Mister Big (1943) as Donald J. O'Connor, Esq.
 Top Man (1943) as Don Warren
 Chip Off the Old Block (1944) as Donald Corrigan
 Follow the Boys (1944) as Donald O'Connor
 This Is the Life (1944) as Jimmy Plum
 The Merry Monahans (1944) as Jimmy Monahan
 Bowery to Broadway (1944) as Specialty Number #1
 Patrick the Great (1945) as Pat Donahue Jr.
 Something in the Wind (1947) as Charlie Read
 Are You With It? (1948) as Milton Haskins
 Feudin', Fussin', and A-Fightin' (1948) as Wilbur McMurty
 Screen Snapshots: Motion Picture Mothers, Inc. (1949, Short) as Himself
 Yes Sir That's My Baby (1949) as William Waldo Winfield
 Francis (1950) as Peter Stirling
 Curtain Call at Cactus Creek (1950) as Edward Timmons
 The Milkman (1950) as Roger Bradley
 Double Crossbones (1951) as Davey Crandall
 Francis Goes to the Races (1951) as Peter Stirling
 Singin' in the Rain (1952) as Cosmo Brown
 Francis Goes to West Point (1952) as Peter Stirling
 Call Me Madam (1953) as Kenneth Gibson
 I Love Melvin (1953) as Melvin Hoover
 Francis Covers the Big Town (1953) as Peter Stirling
 Walking My Baby Back Home (1953) as Clarence 'Jigger' Millard
 Francis Joins the WACS (1954) as Peter Stirling
 Irving Berlin's There's No Business Like Show Business (1954) as Tim Donahue
 Francis in the Navy (1955) as Lt. Peter Stirling / Bosun's Mate Slicker Donovan
 Anything Goes (1956) as Ted Adams
 The Buster Keaton Story (1957) as Buster Keaton
 Cry for Happy (1961) as Murray Prince
 The Wonders of Aladdin (1961) as Aladdin
 That Funny Feeling (1965) as Harvey Granson
 Just One More Time (1974, Short) as Himself (uncredited)
 That's Entertainment! (1974) as Himself - Co-Host / Narrator / Clip from 'Singin' in the Rain'
 The Big Fix (1978) as Francis Joins the Navy
 Ragtime (1981) as Evelyn's Dance Instructor
 Pandemonium (1982) as Glenn's Dad
 A Time to Remember (1987) as Father Walsh
 Toys (1992) as Kenneth Zevo
 Father Frost (1996) as Baba Yaga
 Out to Sea (1997) as Jonathan Devereaux (final film role)

Television
 The Milton Berle Show (producer) – 1948
 Colgate Comedy Hour – 1951–1954
 The Donald O'Connor Show – 19 episodes on NBC, 1954–55
 The Jet Propelled Couch – 1957
 The Judy Garland Show (special guest) – episode 7, season 1 on CBS – September 29, 1963
 Petticoat Junction (director) – 1964
 Bell Telephone Hour – 1964–1966
 The Donald O'Connor Show – 1968
 The Carol Burnett Show - 2 appearances: December 29, 1969 (Season 3, Episode 12) and October 26, 1970 (Season 4, Episode 7)
 Ellery Queen – episode "The Comic Book Crusader" – October 2, 1975
 The Bionic Woman – episode "A Thing of the Past" (February 18, 1976)
 Police Story – September 21, 1976 (Season 4, Episode 1)
 Hunter – episode "The Costa Rican Connection" (March 18, 1977)
 Lucy Moves to NBC - (February 8, 1980)
 The Love Boat – 1981–1984
 Alice – "Guinness on Tap", as himself, 1982
 The Littlest Hobo – episode "The Clown" as Freddie the Clown, 1982 
 Simon and Simon – episode "Grand Illusion" as Barnaby the Great, 1983
 Alice in Wonderland as The Lory Bird, 1985. 
 Highway to Heaven episode "Playing for keeps" – 1987.
 Murder, She Wrote episode (The Big Show of 1965) – 1990
 Tales from the Crypt – season 4, episode 12 "Strung Along", (September 2, 1992)
 The Building – 1993
 Frasier – episode "Crane vs. Crane" as Harlow Safford, 1996
 The Nanny – episode "Freida Needa Man" as Fred (1996)

Stage
 Little Me (1964; 1965; 1968; 1980)
 Promises, Promises (1972)
 Where's Charley? (1976)
 Weekend with Feathers (1976)
 Sugar (1979)
 Wally's Cafe (1980)
 Bring Back Birdie (1981)
 Say Hello to Harvey (1981)
 Show Boat (1982; 1983)
 I Ought to Be in Pictures (1982)
 How to Succeed in Business Without Really Trying (1985)
 Two for the Show (1989)
 Charley's Aunt (1989)
 The Sunshine Boys (1990)
 The Fabulous Palm Springs Follies'' (1998)

See also
 List of dancers

References

External links

 
 
 Mindy Alloff's 1979 interview with O'Connor
 Donald O'Connor on "The Colgate Comedy Hour" (1951-54) at Classic TV Info.
 Donald O'Connor on "Texaco Star Theater" (1954-55) at Classic TV Info.
 Film-shots

1925 births
2003 deaths
20th-century American male actors
20th-century American singers
American male child actors
American male dancers
American male film actors
American male musical theatre actors
American male singers
American male stage actors
American male television actors
American people of Irish descent
American tap dancers
American television directors
Best Musical or Comedy Actor Golden Globe (film) winners
Burials at Forest Lawn Memorial Park (Hollywood Hills)
Male actors from Chicago
Outstanding Performance by a Lead Actor in a Comedy Series Primetime Emmy Award winners
People from Danville, Illinois
Singers from Chicago
Television producers from Illinois
Traditional pop music singers
United States Army Air Forces personnel of World War II
Universal Pictures contract players
Vaudeville performers